The Minié ball or Minie ball, is a type of hollow-based bullet designed by Claude-Étienne Minié, inventor of the French Minié rifle, for muzzle-loading rifled muskets.  It was invented in 1847 and came to prominence in the Crimean War and the American Civil War, where it was found to inflict significantly more serious wounds than earlier round musket balls. Both the American Springfield Model 1861 and the British Pattern 1853 Enfield rifled muskets, the most common weapons used during the American Civil War, used the Minié ball.

Rifling, the addition of spiral grooves inside a gun barrel, imparts a stabilizing spin to a projectile for better external ballistics, greatly increasing the effective range and accuracy of the gun. Before the introduction of the Minié ball, balls had to be rammed down the barrel, sometimes with a mallet, because gunpowder residue would foul a rifled bore after a relatively small number of shots, requiring frequent cleaning of the gun.  The development of the Minié ball was significant because it was the first projectile type that could be made a loose enough fit to easily slide down the barrel of a rifled long gun, yet maintain good accuracy during firing due to obturation by expansion of the bullet's base when fired.

Designs 
The Minié ball is a cylindro-conoidal bullet with grease-filled cannelures on its exterior and a conical concavity in its base. Minié designed the bullet with a small iron plug, and lead skirting that would expand under the pressure of gunpowder deflagration causing the bullet to obturate, and grip the rifling grooves. This maximized muzzle velocity by creating a good bullet-to-bore seal with minimal pressure loss.

A precursor to the Minié ball was created in the 1830s by French Army captains Montgomery and Henri-Gustave Delvigne. Their design was made to allow rapid muzzle loading of rifles, an innovation that brought about the widespread use of the rifle rather than the smoothbore musket as a mass battlefield weapon. Delvigne had invented a ball that could expand upon ramming to fit the grooves of a rifle in 1826.  The cylindro-conoidal ball design had been proposed in 1832 by Captain John Norton, but had not been adopted.

Captain James H. Burton, an armorer at the Harpers Ferry Armory, developed a major improvement on Minié's design when he added a deep conical cavity at the base of the ball, which more efficiently filled up with gas and expanded the bullet's skirt upon firing. A higher percentage of the explosive force went toward forward projectile motion and lesser percentage toward fitting into the rifling. Burton's modified Minie ball had decreased mass and increased speed, resulting in increased energy and better range, as well as a cheaper bullet, which was used in the Crimean War and then the American Civil War.  Burton's version of the ball weighed 1.14 ounces.

Use 
The Minié ball could be quickly removed from the paper cartridge, with the gunpowder poured down the barrel and the unexpanded bullet pushed down after it past the muzzle rifling and any detritus from prior shots. It was then rammed with the ramrod, which packed the charge and filled the hollow base with powder. When the rifle was fired, the exploding gas in the base of the bullet expanded the skirt to engage the rifling, providing spin for accuracy, a better seal for consistent velocity and longer range, and easier cleaning of barrel detritus.

Effects 

Wounds inflicted by the conical Minié ball were different from those caused by the round balls from smoothbore muskets, since the conical ball had a higher muzzle velocity and greater mass, and easily penetrated the human body. Round balls tended to remain lodged in the flesh, and they were often observed to take a winding path through the body. Flexed muscles and tendons, as well as bone, could cause the round ball to deviate from a straight path. The Minié ball tended to cut a straight path and usually went all the way through the injured part; the ball seldom remained lodged in the body. If a Minié ball struck a bone, it usually shattered it. The damage to bones and resulting compound fractures were usually severe enough to necessitate amputation. A hit on a major blood vessel could also have serious and often lethal consequences.

One of the more infamous documented cases involving Minié ball injuries concerned a Confederate soldier wounded during Jubal Early's raid on Washington, D.C., on July 12, 1864. The soldier, a private in the 53rd North Carolina Infantry, was hit in the side of the head by a .58 caliber Minié ball, which shattered his skull and lodged in the right hemisphere of the brain. He went into convulsions and became paralyzed on one side of his body, but started recovering within eight days of being hospitalized. However, within three more days, his condition deteriorated and he eventually lost consciousness and died, having survived with his wound for 16 days. An autopsy of the soldier found that the right hemisphere of the brain was extensively damaged and large areas of it had necrosed. The brain was removed, preserved in formaldehyde and donated to the Army Museum in Washington. The primary cause of death had been infection caused by both the initial injury and subsequent necrosis of brain tissue.

See also 

Cap gun
Caplock mechanism
Gun barrel
Gunpowder
Internal ballistics
Muzzleloader
Nessler ball
Projectile
Rifling
Tubes and primers for ammunition

References

Notes

Bibliography

External links 
Weaponry: The Rifle-Musket and the Minié Ball- Allan W. Howey, for the Civil War Times magazine

Bullets
American Civil War weapons